The 2000–01 season was the 102nd season of competitive league football in the history of English football club Wolverhampton Wanderers. They played the season in the second tier of the English football system, the Football League First Division.

The team finished in 12th position, their lowest league finish for five seasons. Colin Lee began the season as manager but was sacked in December 2000 with the team just a single point clear of the relegation zone. Former Southampton manager Dave Jones replaced him in early January but could not take the side any higher than mid-table.

Results

Pre-season
Wolves' pre season saw them travel to Ireland to play three local sides. They then returned home to play three Premiership teams at Molineux; the fixture against Aston Villa was a testimonial match for Mike Stowell.

Football League First Division

A total of 24 teams competed in the Football League First Division in the 2000–01 season. Each team played every other team twice: once at their stadium, and once at the opposition's. Three points were awarded to teams for each win, one point per draw, and none for defeats.

The provisional fixture list was released on 22 June 2000, but was subject to change in the event of matches being selected for television coverage or police concerns.

Final table

Source: Statto.com

Results summary

Results by round

FA Cup

League Cup

Players

Statistics

|-
|align="left"|||align="left"|||align="left"| 
|46||0||1||0||4||0||51||0||0||0||
|-
|align="left"|||align="left"|||align="left"|  (c)
|37||3||1||0||4||1||42||4||10||1||
|-
|align="left"|||align="left"|||align="left"| 
|||1||2||0||5||0||||1||4||0||
|-
|align="left"|||align="left"|||align="left"| 
|||3||2||1||||1||||5||4||0||
|-
|align="left"|||align="left"|||align="left"| 
|29||2||1||0||0||0||30||2||2||0||
|-
|align="left"|||align="left"|||align="left"| 
|||0||||0||4||0||||0||0||0||
|-
|align="left"|||align="left"|||align="left"| 
|||1||0||0||5||0||||1||2||0||
|-
|align="left"|||align="left"|||align="left"|  †
|||0||2||0||2||0||||0||5||0||
|-
|align="left"|||align="left"|||style="background:#faecc8" align="left"|  ‡
|||0||0||0||0||0||style="background:#98FB98"|||0||2||1||
|-
|align="left"|||align="left"|FW||align="left"| 
|||3||0||0||||1||style="background:#98FB98"|||4||3||0||
|-
|align="left"|10||align="left"|FW||align="left"| 
|||4||2||0||||0||||4||9||0||
|-
|align="left"|11||align="left"|||align="left"| 
|||2||2||0||||0||||2||4||0||
|-
|align="left"|12||align="left"|||align="left"| 
|||0||1||0||1||0||||0||0||0||
|-
|align="left"|14||align="left"|FW||align="left"|  
|||6||||0||||0||||6||6||0||
|-
|align="left"|15||align="left"|||align="left"|  †
|||1||0||0||||0||||1||2||0||
|-
|align="left"|15||align="left"|FW||align="left"|  
|||0||0||0||0||0||style="background:#98FB98"|||0||0||0||
|-
|align="left"|16||align="left"|||align="left"| 
|||0||0||0||2||0||||0||2||0||
|-
|align="left"|17||align="left"|FW||align="left"| 
|||0||0||0||3||3||style="background:#98FB98"|||3||1||0||
|-
|align="left"|18||align="left"|||align="left"|  ¤
|||0||||0||2||0||||0||2||1||
|-
|align="left"|19||align="left"|||align="left"| 
|||2||2||0||5||0||style="background:#98FB98"|||2||3||1||
|-
|align="left"|20||align="left"|||align="left"|  ¤
|||0||2||0||0||0||||0||4||1||
|-
|align="left"|21||align="left"|FW||align="left"| 
|0||0||0||0||0||0||0||0||0||0||
|-
|align="left"|22||align="left"|FW||align="left"| 
|||0||0||0||0||0||||0||0||0||
|-
|align="left"|23||align="left"|||style="background:#faecc8" align="left"|  ‡
|||0||||0||||0||style="background:#98FB98"|||0||0||0||
|-
|align="left"|24||align="left"|||align="left"| 
|31||6||1||0||0||0||style="background:#98FB98"|32||6||5||0||
|-
|align="left"|25||align="left"|||align="left"|  †
|0||0||0||0||0||0||0||0||0||0||
|-
|align="left"|26||align="left"|FW||style="background:#faecc8" align="left"|  ‡
|||0||0||0||1||0||style="background:#98FB98"|||0||0||0||
|-
|align="left"|27||align="left"|||style="background:#faecc8" align="left"|  ‡
|||0||0||0||0||0||style="background:#98FB98"|||0||0||0||
|-
|align="left"|27||align="left"|||style="background:#faecc8" align="left"|  ‡
|||0||0||0||1||0||style="background:#98FB98"|||0||0||0||
|-
|align="left"|27||align="left"|||style="background:#faecc8" align="left"|  ‡
|12||0||0||0||0||0||style="background:#98FB98"|12||0||2||0||
|-
|align="left"|28||align="left"|||align="left"| 
|||0||0||0||0||0||style="background:#98FB98"|||0||0||0||
|-
|align="left"|29||align="left"|||align="left"|  †
|0||0||0||0||0||0||0||0||0||0||
|-
|align="left"|30||align="left"|||align="left"|  ¤
|0||0||0||0||0||0||0||0||0||0||
|-
|align="left"|31||align="left"|FW||align="left"|  ¤
|||8||2||1||||2||style="background:#98FB98"|||11||4||0||
|-
|align="left"|32||align="left"|||align="left"|  ¤
|0||0||0||0||0||0||0||0||0||0||
|-
|align="left"|33||align="left"|||align="left"| 
|0||0||0||0||0||0||0||0||0||0||
|-
|align="left"|36||align="left"|||align="left"| 
|0||0||0||0||0||0||0||0||0||0||
|-
|align="left"|39||align="left"|||align="left"| 
|0||0||0||0||0||0||0||0||0||0||
|-
|align="left"|40||align="left"|||align="left"|  †
|0||0||0||0||0||0||0||0||0||0||
|-
|align="left"|40||align="left"|||align="left"| 
|0||0||0||0||0||0||0||0||0||0||
|-
|align="left"|41||align="left"|||style="background:#faecc8" align="left"|  ‡
|0||0||0||0||0||0||0||0||0||0||
|}

Awards

Transfers

In

Out

Loans in

Loans out

Kit
The season saw the team return to their historic "old gold" shade of shirt for the first time since the 1950s. There was also a new away kit that was a light blue design. Both were now manufactured by the club's own label, entitled "WWFC", and sponsored by Goodyear.

References

2000-01
Wolverhampton Wanderers